Raumism is an ideology beginning in 1980 with the Rauma Manifesto, which criticized the goals of the traditional Esperanto movement and defined the Esperanto community as "a stateless diaspora linguistic minority" based on freedom of association.

Rauma Manifesto 
The Rauma Manifesto was ratified in 1980 at the 36th International Youth Congress in Rauma, Finland. It emphasized that official acceptance of the language was not probable and not essential during the 1980s and that it was necessary to have alternative goals. The manifesto emphasized the fact that the Esperanto-speaking community had itself become a culture, worthy of preservation and promotion for its own sake. It states: "We want to spread Esperanto to realize its positive values more and more, bit by bit (...)"  – a fact that is not widely known.

See also 
 Finvenkismo

References

External links 
 http://www.esperantio.net/
 Discussion in June 2000 in Bja-listo

Criticism of Raumism 
La liturgio de l' foiro (kun suplemento) or La liturgio de l' foiro (unua eldono, nekompleta)

Esperanto culture
Esperanto movement
ism